The Sam Vimes "Boots" theory of socioeconomic unfairness, often called simply the boots theory, is an economic theory first popularised by English fantasy writer Sir Terry Pratchett in his 1993 Discworld novel Men at Arms. In the novel, Sam Vimes, the captain of the Ankh-Morpork City Watch, reasons that poverty causes greater expenses to the poor than to those who are richer. Since its publication, the theory has received wider attention, especially in regard to the effect of increasing prices of daily necessities.

Conception 
In the Discworld series of novels, Sam Vimes is the curmudgeonly but incorruptible captain of the City Watch of the medieval city-state of Ankh-Morpork. The boots theory comes from a passage of the 1993 novel Men at Arms, the second novel to focus on the City Watch, in which he muses about his experiences of poverty as compared to his fiancée Lady Sybil Ramkin's conception of poverty:

The theory has its antecedents; in Robert Tressell's 1914 novel The Ragged-Trousered Philanthropists, protagonist Frank Owen directly refers to clothes and boots as necessities where the total cost over time is greater for the working classes, as "[they] can seldom or never afford to buy good things" and therefore must "buy cheap rubbish, which is dear at any price". Likewise, in a 1954 column for The Observer, humourist Paul Jennings made similar comments about boots, and the adage "buy cheap, buy twice" has sustained itself as a Northern English adage. It has thus been theorized that Pratchett drew inspiration from these antecedents.

Since the publication of Men at Arms, others have also made reference to the theory. In 2013, an 
article by the US ConsumerAffairs made reference to the theory in regard to purchasing items on credit, specifically regarding children's boots from the retailer Fingerhut; a $25 pair of boots, at the interest rates being offered, would cost $37 if purchased over seven months. In 2016, the left-wing blog Dorset Eye also ran an article discussing the theory, giving fuel poverty in the United Kingdom as an example of its application, citing a 2014 Office for National Statistics (ONS) report that those who pre-paid for electricity—who were most likely to be subject to fuel poverty—paid 8% more on their electricity bills than those who paid by direct debit.

In an article titled "The Price of Poverty" published in Tribune Magazine Vimes' Boots Theory was cited as explaining the economic predicament in the U.K. and multiple examples of the theory were listed in action. The article states "wages aren’t driving inflation. They’re barely keeping up. Despite record job vacancies and low unemployment, wage growth fell by 4.5% in April, the fastest decline since records began in 2001. Workers have, in reality, experienced the biggest cut in real wages in 20 years."

Vimes Boots Index 
Inspired by Boots theory, antipoverty activist and food journalist Jack Monroe announced in January 2022 in an opinion piece for The Guardian her own attempt to measure its effect on prices through the creation of the Vimes Boots Index (VBI) tracking the prices of cheapest available foods, as opposed to the ONS's official Consumer Price Index (CPI) and Retail Price Index (RPI). Writing in the context of the official CPI reaching 5.4 per cent, Monroe argued that this did not properly reflect the priorities of the average consumer; in particular she cited items in the ONS's 700-item "basket" including legs of lamb, televisions, and champagnewhose lower rises in price, she argued, had the effect of depressing the effective rate of inflation. Monroe also cited the withdrawal of many value-branded items from supermarketsfor example, a packet of ten stock cubes from Sainsbury's rising from 10p in 2012 to 39p (for beef and chicken) or £1 (for vegetable) in 2022as contributing to increased food poverty. The estate of Pratchett, who died in 2015, gave its full support to Monroe's campaign, quoting Pratchett to say, "Sometimes it's better to light a flamethrower than curse the darkness." 

Shortly after Monroe's announcement, the ONS stated they were going to calculate inflation rates that took income into account. The ONS's head of inflation statistics, Mike Hardie, wrote in a blog post on the department's website that "the average annual rate of inflation can conceal a lot", and agreed that some items analysed in its basketsuch as fruit drinks and margarinehad experienced annual price increases of over 30 per cent, and in some cases, over 100 per cent.

Monroe originally hoped to have the first edition of the VBI published mid-February 2022. As of March 2023, no such index has been presented to the public.

See also 
 False economy
 Ghetto tax

References 

Price indices
Macroeconomics
Discworld